Roughly 8.6 per cent of India's population is made up of "Scheduled Tribes" (STs), traditional tribal communities. Whilst most members of these tribes have adopted variants of Hinduism, Islam, or Christianity, a considerable number still adhere to their traditional tribal religions, with varying degrees of syncretism.

Numbers
According to the 2011 census of India, about 7.9 million out of 1,210 million people did not adhere to any of the subcontinent's main religious communities of Hinduism, Islam, Christianity, Sikhism, Buddhism, or Jainism. The census listed atheists, Zoroastrians, Jews, and various specified and unspecified tribal religions separately under the header "Other Religions and Persuasions".

Of these religious census groupings, the most numerous are Sarna (4.9 million respondents), Gondi (1 million), Sari Dharma (506,000), Donyi-Poloism (331,000); Sanamahi (222,000) and Khasi (139,000), with all other religions numbering less than 100,000 respondents, including 18,000 for "tribal religion", 5,600 for "nature religion", and 4,100 "animists".

Customs
The tribal people observe their festivals, which have no direct conflict with any religion, and they conduct marriage among them according to their tribal custom. They have their own way of life to maintain all privileges in matters connected with marriage and succession, according to their customary tribal faith. In keeping with the nature of Indian religion generally, these particular religions often involve traditions of ancestor worship or worship of spirits of natural features. Tribal beliefs persist as folk religion even among those converted to a major religion.

The largest and best-known tribal religion of India is that of the Santhal of Jharkhand, West Bengal, Odisha, and neighbouring regions. The Santals and other Indian tribes practice, profess and propagate their own traditional tribal religions since time immemorial. They have their own Gods and Goddesses and separate places of worship which is completely different from other Indo-Aryan religions. The Gods and Goddesses of the Santals and other tribals do not belong to Hindu pantheon or any other Indo-Aryan pantheon. "Saridharam" is the only religion of the Santal tribe. And the Sarna religion is the religion of the Munda and Oraon tribe of India.

The Santals and Munda belong to the Austric language family. Tribal communities like the Gond, Bhil, Oraon and Mina belong to the Dravidian language family. Tribal communities like the Bhutia, Lepcha and tribes living in the North-Eastern states belong to the Sino-Tibetan / Tibeto-Burmese language family. People belonging to the Indo-Aryan language family came to the Indian sub-continent around 4000 years back. Among the Munda people and Oraons of Bihar, about 25% of the population are Christian. Among the Kharia people of Bihar (population about 130,000), about 60% are Christians. Tribal groups in the Himalayas following Bon religion were similarly affected by both Hinduism and Buddhism in the late 20th century. The small hunting-and-gathering groups in the union territory of the Andaman and Nicobar Islands have also been under severe pressure of cultural assimilation.

Recognition
According to the Indian legal system, all the native or indigenous religions of India fall broadly under Hinduism, since the constitution does not classify only Vedic religions as Hinduism as used in the colloquial norm. The term "Hindu" is derived from Persian meaning "Indo" (or Indian), hence the official word "Hinduism" broadly refers to all the native cultures of the Indian subcontinent. The 1955 Hindu Marriage Act "[defines] as Hindus anyone who is not a Christian, Muslim, or Jew".

List of current folk religions
 Adivasi religion
 Ahom religion
 Bathouism
 Donyi-Polo
 Kirat Mundhum
 Sanamahism
 Saridharam 
 Sarnaism
 Niamtre (Pnar tribe)

See also
 Dravidian folk religion
 Folk Hinduism
 Indian religions
 Kalashism and Kafirism
 Bon

References

Indian religions
Scheduled Tribes of India
Asian shamanism